The 18th government of Turkey (16 January 1949 – 22 May 1950) is  also referred to as the Günaltay government.

Background 
Hasan Saka of the Republican People's Party (CHP), who was the previous prime minister, resigned on 14 September 1949. President İsmet İnönü, upon the suggestion of Hilmi Uran, the secretary general of his party, assigned Şemsettin Günaltay as the new prime minister. Günaltay was a scholar of religion, philosophy and history. A scholar of religion as the prime minister of a party which was known to be the champion of secularism was quite unexpected.

The government
In the list below, the  cabinet members who served only a part of the cabinet's lifespan are shown in the column "Notes".

Aftermath
Günaltay resigned after his party lost the general elections held on 14 May 1950. The next government was founded by Adnan Menderes of the Democrat Party.

References

Cabinets of Turkey
Republican People's Party (Turkey) politicians
1949 establishments in Turkey
1950 disestablishments in Turkey
Cabinets established in 1949
Cabinets disestablished in 1950
Members of the 18th government of Turkey
8th parliament of Turkey
Republican People's Party (Turkey)